Elizabeth Street may refer to:
 Elizabeth Street, Brisbane, Queensland, Australia
 Elizabeth Street, Hobart, Tasmania, Australia
 Elizabeth Street, Lexington, Kentucky, United States
 Elizabeth Street (Manhattan), New York City, United States
 Elizabeth Street, Melbourne, Victoria, Australia
 Elizabeth Street, Sydney, New South Wales, Australia
 Elizabeth Street (Toronto), Ontario, Canada
 Elizabeth Street School, Worcester, Massachusetts, United States

See also 
 Princess Elizabeth Avenue